Manj Rural District is in Manj District of Lordegan County, Chaharmahal and Bakhtiari province, Iran. At the census of 2006, its population was 9,208 in 1,771 households; there were 8,161 inhabitants in 1,781 households at the following census of 2011; and in the most recent census of 2016, the population of the rural district was 8,573 in 2,231 households. The largest of its 26 villages was Bideleh, with 1,807 people.

References 

Lordegan County

Rural Districts of Chaharmahal and Bakhtiari Province

Populated places in Chaharmahal and Bakhtiari Province

Populated places in Lordegan County